Ravishankar Puvendran (born 26 January 1964 in Colombo, Sri Lanka) usually known as Ravi Puvendran is a Canadian cricket player. He is a left-handed batsman and left-arm spin bowler. He has played two matches for Canada, against Kenya and Bermuda in the ICC Intercontinental Cup in 2006.

In February 2020, he was named in Canada's squad for the Over-50s Cricket World Cup in South Africa. However, the tournament was cancelled during the third round of matches due to the coronavirus pandemic.

References

External links
Pick: Kenya will be tough test ECB - 28 July 2006

1964 births
Living people
Canadian cricketers
Canadian people of Sri Lankan Tamil descent
Sri Lankan Tamil sportspeople
Canadian sportspeople of Sri Lankan descent